Two Blocks from the Edge is Michael Brecker's fifth album as a leader. It was recorded at Avatar Studios in New York City. It was recorded in 1998.

Track listing 
All tracks composed by Michael Brecker; except where indicated

"Madame Toulouse" — 5:19
"Two Blocks from the Edge" — 8:32
"Bye George" (Joey Calderazzo) — 6:59
"El Niño" (Joey Calderazzo) — 7:41
"Cat’s Cradle" (Joey Calderazzo) — 6:43
"The Impaler" (Jeff "Tain" Watts) — 7:13
"How Long ‘Til the Sun" — 7:39
"Delta City Blues" — 5:37

Personnel 
 Michael Brecker — tenor saxophone
 Joey Calderazzo — piano
 James Genus — bass
 Jeff 'Tain' Watts — drums
 Don Alias — percussion

References 

1998 albums
Michael Brecker albums
Impulse! Records albums